Pilot Officer Phillip Howard Leckrone (sometimes spelled Philip) (1912 – 5 January 1941) was an American pilot who flew with the Royal Air Force during the Battle of Britain in World War II. He was one of 11 American pilots who flew with RAF Fighter Command between 10 July and 31 October 1940, thereby qualifying for the Battle of Britain clasp to the 1939–45 campaign star. He was killed in a flying accident in January 1941.

Early life
Leckrone was from Salem, Illinois, the son of William and Lottie Leckrone. He was married to Mackenzie A. Leckrone. He was an experienced pilot, owning his own aircraft.

World War II
Leckrone travelled to Britain in 1940 and enlisted in the Royal Air Force.  Following conversion to the Spitfire at 7OTU RAF Hawarden, he joined No. 616 Squadron at RAF Kenley on 2 August 1940. He flew a Brewster airplane. He flew more than two dozen sorties over the English Channel as a tail-end Charlie in 616 Squadron. He was later posted to No. 71 Squadron at RAF Church Fenton on 12 October 1940, to join other American volunteers in the first 'Eagle' squadron. He was nicknamed "Uncle Sam" and "Zeke".

Death
On 5 January 1941, Leckrone was taking part in a formation practice when he collided with Pilot Officer Edwin Ezell Orbison, who was able to reach base and safety. Leckrone went into a tail-spin and plunged toward the ground. Pilot Officer Vernon Keogh, who was flying in formation practice at 20,000 feet with Orbison and Leckrone, followed Leckrone down, shouting at him over the radio telephone. "Bail out! Bail out!" Leckrone did not reply and made no attempt to bail out. He died on impact and was the first fatality in No. 71 Squadron.

He is buried in Kirton-in-Lindsey Cemetery in Lincolnshire.

See also

Eagle Squadron
List of RAF aircrew in the Battle of Britain
Non-British personnel in the RAF during the Battle of Britain

References

Bibliography

External links 
Battle of Britain London Monument - P/O P H Leckrone
Aircraft accidents in Yorkshire

1912 births
1941 deaths
American expatriates in the United Kingdom
American Royal Air Force pilots of World War II
The Few
Aviators killed in aviation accidents or incidents in England
Royal Air Force personnel killed in World War II
People from Salem, Illinois
Royal Air Force Volunteer Reserve personnel of World War II